Simone Cecchetti (born September 14, 1973) is an Italian portrait photographer.

In his career, Cecchetti has been photographing music and entertainment performers in Europe and Japan. His portfolio contains pictures taken in more than 1000 concerts for over 600 artists. His portrait of Mick Jagger has been chosen for the exhibition "Mick Jagger. The photobook", which was presented in the French photography festival Rencontres d'Arles in summer 2010.
Among other portraits: Madonna, Nick Cave, Aerosmith, U2, Depeche Mode, George Michael, Lady Gaga, Elvis Costello, Bruce Springsteen.
 
His pictures have been published on Rolling Stone, GQ, Mojo. He works for Corbis, the American image licensing company founded by Bill Gates.

In 2010 he has been chosen to photograph the mounting and the opening of MAXXI in Rome, the contemporary arts museum designed by Zaha Hadid.

In 2011 his Visions project focused on the artistic content within music shows.

In the same year his picture of ZZ Top was selected to be in the book Music:Box, edited by Gino Castaldo and published by Contrasto. The same book has been translated and published worldwide by six other publishers.

In 2011 Cecchetti started to work with A.S. Roma, with the aim to transfer his rock and roll style in sportsmen portraits.
In 2012 his pictures are used for some album covers,  Niccolo Fabi (Ecco), Marina Rei (La conseguenza naturale dell'errore), Alessandro Grazian (Armi), Roberto Angelini (Phineas Gage), Andy Timmons (Plays Sgt Pepper), Malika Ayane e Japandroids.

In 2013, the cover for Una Rosa Blanca (Zucchero Fornaciari) and the pictures from Simone Cristicchi (Album di Famiglia), Fiorella Mannoia (A te), Eros Ramazzotti (Noi Due), Francesco Forni and Ilaria Graziano (From Bedlam to Lenane), Vinicio Capossela e la Banda della posta, Tommy Emmanuel (Live and Solo in Pensacola).
In 2014 the cover for Alessandro Mannarino (Al Monte), Tommy Emmanuel (The Guitar Mastery of Tommy Emmanuel), Deborah Iurato (Deborah Iurato), Giada Agasucci (Da Capo), Tosca (Il suono della voce), Diodato (A ritrovar bellezza), Fabrizio Bosso e Julian Oliver Mazzariello (Tandem), Fabrizio Bosso e Marco Moreggia (Magic Susi), Ilaria Graziano and Francesco Forni (Come 2 Me).
In 2015 the cover of L'amore si muove ("Love Moves") is the fourth studio album by Italian operatic pop trio Il Volo.

From 2016 is a Contour photographer for Getty, the American image licensing company.

In the 2018, the cover for Zerovskij (Renato Zero), Eco di Sirene (Carmen Consoli), Tommy Emmanuel (Accomplice One) and the pictures for Alt in Tour (Renato Zero).

In the 2019 (Teresa De Sio) for the lp Puro desiderio , Rockstar Mai by Young Signorino and Vinicio Capossela Ballate per uomini e bestie, directed and filmed the videoclip Di città in città (e porta l’orso).

Books 
Mick Jagger. The Photobook, Exhibition catalogue, Rencontres d'Arles, Contrasto, 2010, .
Les rencontres d'Arles 2010 - Du lourd et du piquant, Editions Actes Sud, 2010, .
 Stefano Chiodi e Domitilla Dardi (ed.), SPACE. From MAXXI's collections of art and architecture. Exhibition catalogue, Milano, Mondadori Electa, 2010, .
 Cristiana Parrella, Kutlug Ataman. Mesopotamian dramaturgies, Milano, Mondadori Electa, 2010, 
 Gino Castaldo, Music:Box, Contrasto, 2011, 
 Christopher Andersen, "Mick Jagger. Gli eccessi, la pazzia, il genio", Sperling & Kupfer, 2012, 
 Daniel Ichbiah, "Le dictionnaire Rolling Stones", CITY, 2012, 
 Gilles Lhote, "Rolling Stones, 50 ans après: 50 ans de légende, 50 tubes mythiques", DU ROCHER, 2013, 
 Giovanni Rossi, Roger Waters. Oltre il muro, Tsunami, 2013, 
 Billy J Altman, "Mick Jagger: A spectacular Rock Life", White Star, 2013, 
 Victor Bockris, "Transformer: The Complete Lou Reed Story", Harper, 2014, 
 Il Volo, Un'avventura straordinaria. La nostra storia, Rizzoli,

Exhibitions 
Mick Jagger Photobook, July 3 - September 19, 2010, Arles/ December 3, 2010 - February 13, 2011, Galleria Forma, Milan / February 22 - March 27, 2011 - Auditorium Parco della Musica, Rome / April 9 - May 15, 2011, Multimedia Art Museum, Moscow.
Visions, February 16–27, 2011, Galleria Ex Roma Club Monti, Rome.
Mostra personale, September 7–11, 2011, Pomigliano Jazz, Pomigliano d'Arco, Naples.

References

External links
Official website

Photographers from Rome
Rock music photographers
1973 births
Portrait photographers
Living people